Blinky is a 1923 American silent Western comedy film directed by Edward Sedgwick and starring Hoot Gibson and Esther Ralston.

Plot
Geoffrey "Blinky" Islip is forced to join the United States Cavalry by his father Colonel "Raw Meat" Islip. Although Islip is ridiculed and hazed on assignment to the Mexico–United States border, he uses his skills learned from Boy Scouts to rescue his commanding officer Major Kileen's daughter Mary Lou from kidnappers.

Cast
 Hoot Gibson as Geoffrey Arbuthnot Islip (Blinky)
 Esther Ralston as Mary Lou Kileen
 Mathilde Brundage as Mrs. Islip
 DeWitt Jennings as Colonel "Raw Meat" Islip
 Elinor Field as Priscilla Islip
 D.R.O. Hatswell as Bertrand Van Dusen
 Charles K. French as Major Kileen
 John Judd as Husk Barton
 W. E. Lawrence as Lieutenant Rawkins (credited as William E. Lawrence)

Production

The film was shot at Universal City Studios and Imperial Beach, California. Real-life cavalrymen from Camp Hearne were used as extras. Sedgewick broke his leg during the production.

Preservation
With no prints of Blinky located in any film archives, it is a lost film.

See also
 Hoot Gibson filmography

References

External links

 
 

1923 films
1923 comedy films
1920s Western (genre) comedy films
1920s English-language films
American black-and-white films
Films directed by Edward Sedgwick
Silent American Western (genre) comedy films
Universal Pictures films
Films about the United States Army
Films shot in Los Angeles County, California
1920s American films